The Women's 400 metre individual medley competition of the 2018 European Aquatics Championships was held on 3 August 2018.

Records
Before the competition, the existing world and championship records were as follows.

Results

Heats
The heats were started at 09:30.

Final
The final was held at 17:00.

References

Women's 400 metre individual medley